Monoamine-depleting agents are a group of drugs which reversibly deplete one or more monoamine neurotransmitters. One mechanism by which these agents act is by inhibiting reuptake by the vesicular monoamine transporters, VMAT1 and VMAT2. Examples of monoamine-depleting agents include deutetrabenazine, oxypertine, reserpine, tetrabenazine, and valbenazine.

References

Monoamine-depleting agents
VMAT inhibitors